The 1977 United States rugby union tour of England was a series of six matches played by the U.S.A. "Eagles" in England in September and October 1977. The United States team won two of the six matches, and lost the other four, including the international match against the England national rugby union team. England did not award full international caps for this match and the team was described as "An England XV" rather than simply "England".

Matches 
Scores and results list United States's points tally first.

Notes

References

Rugby union tours of England
United States national rugby union team tours
United States
tour
Tour
United States rugby union